Dale Holmes (born 6 October 1971, Heanor, Derbyshire) is a British former professional "Old/Mid School" Bicycle Motocross (BMX) racer whose prime competitive years were from 1983 to 2009.

Racing career milestones

Note: Professional first are on the national level unless otherwise indicated.

Started Racing: 1982, aged 10, in England. He first noticed BMX on reading a BMX mag back in 1980.

First race result: Fourth place in 9 year age group at the Nottingham Outlaws BMX track in Nottingham, England.

Sanctioning Body:

First win (local):

First sponsor: Bunny's Bike Shop (Private Company)

First national win:  At a 1985 United Kingdom National in Slough, England in 13 Expert.

Turned Professional: In mid 1988 at 16 in England directly after the 1988 IBMXF European Championships. 

First Professional race result: Second Place in Superclass Poole UKBMX National.

First Professional win: NBMXA British Championships 1988.

First National win: 13 Expert Slough 1985.

First Pro/ Superclass win: NBMXA British Championships 1988.

Retired from Elite: In late 2006 to concentrate on 4x Mountain Bike (MTB) Racing. He recently started BMX racing again in the ABA Veteran's Pro class. His debut race was on 1 September 2007 at the ABA Black Jack Nationals in Reno, Nevada. He won on Saturday (1 September) and came in second on Sunday.

Height & weight at height of his career (1995–2006): Ht:5'9" Wt:182 lbs.

*In the NBL it is B"/Superclass/"A" pro (beginning with 2000 season); in the ABA it is "A" pro.
**In the NBL it is "A" pro (Elite men); in the ABA it is "AA" pro.

Career factory and major bike shop sponsors

Note: This listing only denotes the racer's primary sponsors. At any given time a racer could have numerous ever changing co-sponsors. Primary sponsorships can be verified by BMX press coverage and sponsor's advertisements at the time in question. When possible exact dates are given.

Amateur/Junior Men
Nottingham Outlaws: 1982
Bunneys/GT BMX: 1983–1984
JMC (James Melton Cyclery) Racing Equipment: 1985
Powerlite Engineering: 1986–1987

Professional/Elite Men
Cyclecraft: 1988–1989
ELF (Extra Light Frames): 1989–1990
MCS (Moto Cross Specialties) Bicycle Specialties (European Division): 1990-December 1991
Webco Bicycles: January 1992-December 1992. This is not the same famous American pioneering Webco Inc. of the early to late 1970s. This Webco is the West European Bicycle Company created in 1991 by Gerrit Does, the person who introduced BMX to Europe (the Netherlands specifically) and co-founded the IBMXF.
GT (Gary Turner) Bicycles (UK/Europe): January 1993-September 1999. Holmes was dropped by GT Bicycles the day after the 1999 NBL Grandnationals. According to Todd Corbitt, GT team manager and former pro racer GT, was overstaffed with professionals. Holmes contract still ran until the end of 1999 but GT would release him if he gets an offer of sponsorship from another company.
Nirve: 26 December 1999 - late November 2001
O'Neal/Atomic: Early 2002- late November 2002
Free Agent: 2002 – 25 November 2013. As the Team Manager of Free Agent World Team post his October 2006 BMX retirement at Elite level. He was also signed by KHS Bicycles to race Mountain Bikes (MTB) at the same time. The 2002 ABA Grand National was his first race with Free Agent.
Dale Holmes Racing: 2014 Started own team with Chase Bicycles as primary bike sponsor
Dale Holmes Racing: 2016 Dale Holmes Racing with Stay Strong Title Sponsor
Dale Holmes Racing: 2017 USA Cycling Development Team with Haro Bikes & Rockstar Energy
Dale Holmes Racing: 2018 USA Cycling Development Team with Haro Bikes & Rockstar Energy
Dale Holmes Racing: 2019 Haro 
Dale Holmes Racing: 2020 Haro 
Dale Holmes Racing: 2021 Haro / Dvide / Source BMX 
Dale Holmes Racing: 2022 Haro / Dvide / Source BMX

Career bicycle motocross titles

Amateur/Junior Men
National Bicycle Motocross Association (NBMXA)(UKBMX)
1985 NBMXA 13 Expert National No.1
1987 NBMXA 15 Expert and 14 & 15 Cruiser National No.1
1987 UKBMX 15 Expert National No.1
1987 UKBMX 15 Expert Champion of Champions 1st1988 NBMXA 16 Expert British Champion1988 NBMXA 16+ Cruiser British Champion1988 NBMXA Superclass British Champion1988 NBMXA Triple British Champion winning 3 Classes same day1988 UKBMX Champion of Champions 1st place SuperclassInternational Bicycle Motocross Federation (IBMXF)*1985 13 Expert European Championships Spain 6th1986 14 Expert European Championships Germany 7th1987 15 Expert European Championships Belgium 2nd1987 14–15 Cruiser European Championships Belgium 7th 1987 15 Expert European Cup 2nd Netherlands1987 14–15 Cruiser European Cup 1st Netherlands1988 16 Expert European Championships Netherlands 8th1988 16–17 Cruiser European Championships Netherlands 2nd 1988 16 Expert European Cup 1st Netherlands1988 16 Expert Romford International England 1st*See note in professional section

Professional/Elite Men
Turned Professional 1988 Age 16

English Bicycle Motocross Association (EBA) (UK)1989 EBA British Champion1989 EBA National Champion1990 EBA Cruiser British Champion1990 EBA National Champion1990 EBA Cruiser National Champion1991 EBA British Champion1991 EBA Cruiser British Champion1991 EBA National Champion1993 EBA Cruiser British Champion1994 EBA National Champion1994 EBA Cruiser National Champion1994 EBA British Champion1994 EBA Cruiser British Champion1995 EBA National Champion1995 EBA Cruiser National Champion1995 EBA British Champion1995 EBA Cruiser British Champion1996 EBA National Champion1997 EBA National Champion1997 EBA British Champion1998 EBA British Champion1999 EBA British Champion2000 EBA British ChampionBritish Cycling Bicycle Motocross (BCBMX) (BCF )2002 British Champion2003 Cruiser British Champion2004 British Champion2004 Cruiser British Champion2005 Cruiser British ChampionNational Bicycle League (NBL)
1999 Pro Class/Pro Open/Pro Cruiser Triple Big Bear Nationals (3 Pro Wins same day ) 
1999 Pro Class and Pro Cruiser Grand National Champion1999 National No.1 Pro Cruiser2009 2010 Elite Masters National No.1

American Bicycle Association (ABA)
1993 ABA Grand Nationals winner A Pro
1999 National No.1 Pro Cruiser
1999 ABA World Champion Pro Cruiser
1999 ABA World Champion AA Pro
2001 20" World Cup Champion
2001 ABA Grand Nationals Pro Open Champion
2007 Grand Nationals Veteran Pro Champion
2007 Disney Cup Veteran Pro Champion
2008 Disney Cup Veteran Pro Champion

International Bicycle Motocross Federation (IBMXF)*
1986 14–15 Cruiser Bronze Medal World Championship

Union Cycliste Internationale (UCI)*
1993 Elite Men Silver Medal World Championship
1994 Elite Cruiser Bronze Medal World Championship
1995 Elite Men Silver Medal European Championship
1996 Elite Men World Champion
1996 Elite Men European Champion
1997 Elite Men World Cup Champion
1997 Elite Men European Champion
1997 Elite Cruiser Bronze Medal World Championship
1998 Elite Cruiser Silver Medal World Championship
2000 Elite Men Bronze Medal World Championship
2001 Elite Men World Champion
2001 Elite Cruiser Silver Medal World Championship
2008 Masters World Champion
2008 35–40 Cruiser World Champion
2009 Masters Silver Medal World Championship
2009 35–40 Cruiser World Champion

*Note: Beginning in 1991 the IBMXF and FIAC, the amateur cycling arm of the UCI, had been holding joint World Championship events as a transitional phase in merging which began in earnest in 1993. Beginning with the 1996 season the IBMXF and FIAC completed the merger and both ceased to exist as independent entities being integrated into the UCI. Beginning with the 1996 World Championships held in Brighton, England the UCI would officially hold and sanction BMX World Championships and with it inherited all precedents, records, streaks, etc. from both the IBMXF and FIAC.
Pro Series Championships and Invitationals

Notable accolades
1996 British Cyclist of the Year
2009 Inducted into the British Cycling Hall of Fame
2 x European Champion 
1 x UCI World Cup Champion
5 x World Champion
5 x UCI World Team Championships
3 x US National Champion

Significant injuries
Broke hand at the UCI World Championships in Paris, France on 31 July 2005 laid up until December 2005. He took a brief hiatus from racing after the hand healed.

Racing habits and traits

Miscellaneous
 Holmes is a contributing writer for BMX Plus! magazine. He has a monthly side bar news article in BMX Plus!s "Inside Scoop" section called the "Dale Holmes Update".
 In 2003, just before the ABA Reno, Nevada National, Holmes was doing practice sprints on his race bike  when he was accosted and mugged by two men one armed with a knife, the other with a gun, which he pointed at Holmes' head. They proceeded to rob Holmes of his backpack and race bike. Holmes was unharmed.
 Is a regular at Starbucks on Winchester Rd, Murrieta and Soup Plantation
 Holmes is the Team Manager of the 2 x Olympic Gold Medalist, Maris Strombergs
 Team Managed Free Agent to 3 x UCI World Champion Team Titles
 2 x Member of Team GT World Championships Team wins during UCI World Championships
 During the 2012 London Olympic Games, Holmes was the guest TV pundit for BBC's live coverage of the BMX event

BMX press magazine interviews and articles
"On the Squad" BMX Biker Monthly 1984 No.8 pg.36 (Extended photo caption in bold typeface)
"Dale Holmes Takes The Title!" BMX Plus! December 1996 Vol.19 No.12 pg.44 Brief interview on how he won the 1996 Elite Men UCI World Championship.
"Q&A: Have you ever cheated racing?" Snap BMX Magazine May 1999 Vol.6 Iss.3 No.31 pg.25 One of 10 separate interviews of different racers including Brian Foster and Matt Hadan asking if they ever cheated during a race.
"Dale Holmes Rides" Moto Mag July/August 2003 Vol 2, No 3, p. 27

Post BMX career
He retired from Elite racing in October 2006 to pursue a Mountain Bike Racing Career full-time. However, as of November 2007 he is team manager of the Free Agent World Team in BMX and has returned to BMX racing in the Veteran Pro Class. He continues to race mountain bike four-cross for KHS. At the time of his BMX retirement he said it was just time for a change: 

Mountain bike career recordStarted racing: 2002Sub Discipline: Four-crossSanctioning body: UCI

Career MTB factory and major Non-factory sponsorsNote: This listing only denotes the racer's primary sponsors. At any given time a racer could have numerous ever changing co-sponsors. Primary sponsorships can be verified by MTB press coverage and sponsor's advertisements at the time in question. When possible exact dates are given.

ProfessionalOrange:       2001 – 2002KHS Bicycles: 2002 – 2013

Career Mountain Bike Racing (MTB) titles

Note: Listed are Regional, National and International titles.

ProfessionalBritish Cycling'
2 x British National 4-Cross Champion
 4x European Championships 3rd
 2005 4x World Championship 7th

Honours
In 2009, he was inducted into the British Cycling Hall of Fame.

See also
 Motocross

References

External links
 
 

1971 births
Living people
English male cyclists
BMX riders
Four-cross mountain bikers
People from Heanor
Sportspeople from Derbyshire
UCI BMX World Champions (elite men)